William Cullen (March 4, 1826 – January 17, 1914) was a U.S. Representative from Illinois.

Born in County Donegal, Ireland, Cullen immigrated to the United States in 1832 with his parents, who settled in Pittsburgh, Pennsylvania, where he attended the public schools and the Allegheny Academy. He later relocated to Adams Township, LaSalle County, Illinois, in 1846 and engaged in agricultural pursuits. Sheriff of LaSalle County, Illinois (1864–65). He moved to Ottawa, Illinois, in 1865, and worked as the political editor of the Ottawa Republican 1871-1887. Cullen was elected as a Republican to the Forty-seventh and Forty-eighth Congresses (March 4, 1881 – March 3, 1885).

Cullen was an unsuccessful candidate for renomination in 1884. He lived in retirement in Ottawa, Illinois, until his death there January 17, 1914. He was interred in Ottawa Avenue Cemetery.

References

1826 births
1914 deaths
Irish emigrants to the United States (before 1923)
People from LaSalle County, Illinois
Politicians from County Donegal
People from Ottawa, Illinois
Illinois sheriffs
Republican Party members of the United States House of Representatives from Illinois
19th-century American politicians